Deracolliery Township is a census town in Angul district  in the state of Odisha, India.

Demographics
 India census, Deracolliery Township had a population of 18,583. Males constitute 55% of the population and females 45%. Deracolliery Township has an average literacy rate of 77%, higher than the national average of 59.5%: male literacy is 82% and, female literacy is 71%. In Deracolliery Township, 12% of the population is under 6 years of age.

References

Cities and towns in Angul district
Townships in India